Mani Madhaveeyam (മാണി മാധവീയം in Malayalam) is a biographical book written on the life of Guru Māni Mādhava Chākyār (1989-1991), who was the greatest Kutiyattam-Chakyar Koothu (2000-year-old Sanskrit drama tradition of Kerala, India) exponent and Rasa-abhinaya (classical Indian style of acting according to Natya Shastra) maestro of modern times. The book is published by the Department of Cultural Affairs of Government of Kerala, India in May 1991. The author of the book is Das Bhargavinilayam

Notes

See also
Māni Mādhava Chākyār
Kutiyattam
Chakyar Koothu
Natyakalpadrumam
Culture of Kerala
Culture of India

1991 non-fiction books
Indian non-fiction books
Books of Hindu biography
20th-century Indian books